David C. Paul (born 1966/1967) is an American billionaire businessman and the founder and executive chairman of Globus Medical, a medical device manufacturer.

Education
David Paul is an engineer by training, receiving a B.S. in Mechanical Engineering from the University of Madras.  He moved to the United States from India to earn his M.S. in Computer Integrated Mechanical Engineering Systems from Temple University.

References

1960s births
Living people
American billionaires
Temple University alumni
American company founders